His Regeneration is a 1915 American comedy silent film made by Essanay Studios. It featured Charlie Chaplin in an uncredited role as a customer.

Synopsis

A rough criminal gets into an argument over a girl in a dance hall.

Cast
 Gilbert M. 'Broncho Billy' Anderson - The Regenerate Burglar
 Marguerite Clayton - The Girl
 Lee Willard - The Regenerate Burglar
 Hazel Applegate - The Maid
 Belle Mitchell - The Saloon Girl
 Lloyd Bacon - The Regenerate Burglar
 Robert McKenzie - The Waiter
 Bill Cato - First Cop at House
 Darr Wittenmyer - Second Cop at House
 Victor Potel - Pawn Shop Clerk
 Charles Chaplin - Customer (uncredited)

See also
 List of American films of 1915

References

External links 

1915 films
1915 comedy films
Silent American comedy films
American silent short films
American black-and-white films
Essanay Studios films
Films directed by Broncho Billy Anderson
1915 short films
American comedy short films
1910s American films